The English and Foreign Languages University known as EFLU is a central university for English and foreign languages located in Hyderabad, India. It is the only such university dedicated to languages in South Asia.

The university offers the study of English and foreign languages like Arabic, Chinese, French, German, Spanish, Italian, Russian, Japanese, Korean, Persian, Turkish in the areas of Teacher Education, Literature, Linguistics, Interdisciplinary and Cultural Studies.

History 
EFLU, Hyderabad was founded in 1958 as the Central Institute of English by Pandit Jawaharlal Nehru, India's first Prime Minister. The  Central Institute of English, Hyderabad had started functioning with effect from 17 November 1958. It was renamed the Central Institute of English and Foreign Languages (CIEFL) in 1972 with the addition of three major foreign languages – German, Russian and French. The Educational Media Research Center (EMMRC) was established at CIEFL in 1984. In 2006, CIEFL received central university status and was renamed to English and Foreign Languages University (EFLU), by an act of the Parliament.

Campus

EFLU Hyderabad campus 
This is the main campus, situated in the heart of Hyderabad, the capital of Telangana. This is the oldest of the campuses of the university. The campus has 7 schools with 26 departments. Apart from graduate, postgraduate, and research programmes, EFLU also offers postgraduate diplomas, and distance and part-time mode courses.

Hostels 
The campus houses five hostels two for men and three for women.
 Basheer Men's Hostel
 Tagore International Men's Hostel
 Mahlaqa Bai Chanda Women's Hostel
 Akka Mahadevi Women's Hostel
 Amrita Pritam International Women's Hostel

Regional campuses 
The University has one main campus – at Hyderabad; and two regional centres – at Shillong (1973) and Lucknow (1979). They have their own libraries and hostel facilities.

EFLU Shillong campus 
The English and Foreign Languages University (EFLU) Shillong Campus was established in Shillong in 1973 as the Central Institute of English and Foreign Languages (CIEFL) North-East Campus, one year after Meghalaya achieved statehood. The aim of establishing this campus was to cater to the linguistic and research needs of the region as well as to provide quality training for teachers.

Here is a list of courses offered in the campus
 BA English/Mass Communication and Journalism
 MA in English/Linguistics /Mass Communication and Journalism/English Literature,
 M.Phil and PhD courses in English Literature and English Language Education, along with Linguistics.
 Certificate, Diploma and Advanced Diploma courses in French, German, Spanish and Russian languages.

EFLU Lucknow campus 
Situated on the banks of Gomti, the Lucknow campus is housed in the Moti Mahal Campus, RanaPratap Marg, Lucknow.

The EFL University Campus at Lucknow was started in 1979 to provide training to university/college teachers of English in northern India, but it slowly emerged as a full-fledged Centre offering PG Diploma in the Teaching of English, degree and research programmes. The campus has been actively engaged in conducting refresher courses for university and college teachers, proficiency courses for a wide spectrum of learners and contact programmes for the participants of Postgraduate Certificate course in the Teaching of English. The campus also offers a Postgraduate Diploma in Communication. All programmes run by the Campus are face-to-face and are not offered through the distance mode. The campus has its own library and hostel.

Academics 
Dedicated to the study of English and foreign languages, the university was set up to conduct advanced research and training in English and foreign languages, in areas of Teacher Education, Literature, Linguistics, Interdisciplinary and Cultural Studies.

Official journal 
The EFLU publishes Contextures: A Journal of Literature and Culture bi-annually. It aims to contribute to the debates over literary and cultural practices from heterogeneous perspectives by bringing together several departments of literature.

See also 
 List of central universities in India

References

External links 
 

Central universities in India
Language education in India
English and Foreign Languages University
Research institutes in Hyderabad, India
1958 establishments in Andhra Pradesh
Educational institutions established in 1958
Universities in Telangana